The following tables shows the world record progression in the Men's 3000 metres. 
The International Amateur Athletics Federation, now known as the International Association of Athletics Federations, ratified its first world record in the event in 1912.

To June 21, 2009, 26 world records have been ratified by the IAAF in the event.

Pre-IAAF era, to 1912

IAAF era, from 1912

(+) - indicates en route time during longer race.

Auto times to the hundredth of a second were accepted by the IAAF for events up to and including 10,000 m from 1981.

See also 
 World record progression for the Women's 3,000 m
 Long-distance track event

References

Men's world athletics record progressions
World record

de:3000-Meter-Lauf#Weltrekordentwicklung
nl:3000 meter (atletiek)#Wereldrecordontwikkeling
fi:3 000 metrin juoksu#Maailmanennätyksen kehitys